Frank Fahrenhorst (born 24 September 1977) is a German former professional footballer, who played as a defender and is currently manager of VfB Stuttgart II.

Club career 
Born in Kamen, North Rhine-Westphalia, Fahrenhorst turned professional with VfL Bochum in 1996 and remained with them for eight seasons as they yo-yo'ed between the top two divisions.

In the summer of 2004, the defender switched to then-champions Werder Bremen, where he won the DFB-Ligapokal against Bayern Munich. The club never managed any further honours during his two seasons there but he did achieve eight appearances in the UEFA Champions League.

On 9 August 2006, he transferred to Hannover 96, as part of the deal which saw Per Mertesacker move in the opposite direction.

On 27 September 2008, Hannover 96 were scheduled to play Bayern Munich at the AWD-Arena. Fahrenhorst was allowed exclusion from the team as his wife was close to giving birth. However, shortly before the match began, Jiří Štajner accidentally injured Mario Eggimann's eye in training. Due to Eggiman's injury, Fahrenhorst was hastily recalled into the starting line-up against the defending champions. He gave an eye-catching, determined performance as Hannover 96 ran out 1–0 winners. On 22 April 2009, Hannover 96 announced that they would not renew his contract.

Fahrenhorst left the club on 30 June 2009 at the end of his contract and joined MSV Duisburg until 30 June 2011. On 17 August 2010 he signed a two-year contract with FC Schalke 04 II.

International career 
On 12 August 2004, Fahrenhorst was first invited to the senior national team of Germany, when he was nominated for the test match at the Ernst Happel Stadium in Vienna against Austria. Six days later, Fahrenhorst debuted in this game for the senior team and played the full 90 minutes. On 8 September 2004, Fahrenhorst made his second and final appearances for the senior national team when he played another 90 minutes in the 1-1 draw against Brazil in Berlin's Olympic Stadium. Both matches were international friendlies in the run-up to 2006 FIFA World Cup on home soil.

Coaching career
From 2012 to 2020 Fahrenhorst worked for FC Schalke 04 as youth coach. In the summer of 2020 he became the new head coach of VfB Stuttgart II.

Career statistics

Club

Honours
Werder Bremen
DFL-Ligapokal: 2006

References

External links
 
 
 

1977 births
Living people
People from Kamen
Sportspeople from Arnsberg (region)
Association football defenders
German footballers
Germany international footballers
Germany under-21 international footballers
Germany B international footballers
Bundesliga players
2. Bundesliga players
VfL Bochum players
VfL Bochum II players
SV Werder Bremen players
Hannover 96 players
MSV Duisburg players
FC Schalke 04 II players
Hammer SpVg players
Footballers from North Rhine-Westphalia
VfB Stuttgart II managers
German football managers